Greenliant Systems is an American manufacturer of NAND flash memory-based solid state storage and controller semiconductors for embedded systems and datacenter products. Greenliant is headquartered in Santa Clara, California, with offices in North America, Europe and Asia.

History
Silicon Storage Technology (SST) developed NANDrive technology, and was acquired in April 2010 by Microchip Technology. SST's founder and CEO Bing Yeh founded Greenliant along with other former SST executives after the acquisition. In May 2010, Greenliant acquired NANDrive technology and other assets from Microchip for an estimated $23.6 million.

The Greenliant logo symbolizes a multi-chip module with an energy-efficient core and the name represents green and reliable.

Products 
In November 2010, Greenliant began sampling its Serial ATA interface NANDrive GLS85LS products, which had up to 64GB capacity in a 14mm × 24mm × 1.95mm, 145 BGA (ball grid array), 1mm ball pitch package.

In June 2012, Greenliant began sampling its embedded MultiMediaCard (eMMC) interface NANDrive GLS85VM products, which operate at industrial temperatures between -40 and +85 degrees, and are offered in a 14mm × 18mm × 1.40mm, 100-ball, 1mm ball pitch package.

References 

Fabless semiconductor companies
Companies based in Santa Clara, California
Manufacturing companies established in 2010
Semiconductor companies of the United States